Nixie may refer to:

 Nixie (folklore), a water spirit in Germanic mythology and folk tales
 Nixie tube, a gas-filled electron tube once in use as an alphanumeric display
 Melusine or Nixie, a mythical feminine spirit of fresh waters in sacred springs and rivers
 Nixie (Dungeons & Dragons), a creature from Dungeons & Dragons
 AN/SLQ-25 Nixie, a torpedo decoy
 Nixie (postal), a piece of undeliverable mail, or the postal marking on such a piece of mail
 Nixie, one of the three main mermaids in the first season of Mako: Island of Secrets
 Nixie (drone), a wearable camera-equipped drone

See also 
 Nixi (disambiguation)
 Nixe (disambiguation)